Major Margaret Clothilde MacDonald  (26 February 1873 – 7 September 1948) was a Canadian military nurse. She is well known for being one of the first females to hold a position in the completely male-dominated military of her time. She is also known for her breakthrough role as a military nurse during World War I. During this time, she was given the title of Matron-in-Chief of the Canadian Army Medical Corps Nursing Service. Also, Margaret MacDonald was the first woman to be given a 'Major' military rank in the British Empire and was awarded the Royal Red Cross (1916) and the Florence Nightingale Medal (1918).

Margaret MacDonald was born in Bailey's Brook, Nova Scotia on February 26, 1873. She was born into a wealthy, Catholic family. Her father was Donald St. Daniel MacDonald and her mother was Mary Elizabeth Chisholm. Margaret was the third of eleven children and was presented with a plethora of opportunities due to her family's wealth. She had the opportunity to receive an education from an early age, which was atypical for girls of that time. Margaret grew to appreciate education from this upbringing and continued her educational journey with her sisters at Mount St. Vincent Academy, which was a convent school where she was taught by the Sisters of Charity. Around this time, Margaret became interested in nursing and, against her parents' wished, she went on to study nursing at Charity Hospital Training School in New York.

After her graduation in 1895, Margaret MacDonald went to Panama to assist as a nurse during the construction of the Panama Canal. After this, she began her first nursing job as a military nurse, where she was one of the first women to play a role in the war. Her first job was aboard the military ship, Relief, during the Spanish-American War in 1898, where she took care of American soldiers, both the wounded and the sick. Margaret also served as a nurse during the South African War in 1900, where she was one of the first females to receive a military commission. After this, Margaret returned Canada and was soon named the head of the Nursing Service of the Canadian Army Medical Corps. She then moved to Britain to learn from their military nursing program, which was very well known at the time. At this point, Margaret focused more on leadership and working to make a change for women. Also during this time, Margaret was the first woman to be given a 'Major' military rank in the British Empire for her leadership during World War I.

In 1920, after many years of nursing, Margaret retired, returning to her home town of Bailey's Brook, Nova Scotia. She died in Nova Scotia on September 7, 1948, at the age of 75.

Early life 

Margaret MacDonald was born on February 26, 1873, in Bailey's Brook, Pictou County, Nova Scotia, the day before her mother, Mary Elizabeth Chisholm's, 24th birthday, at a time when many mothers and infants died during child birth. Margaret was Mary Elizabeth Chisholm and Donal St. Daniel MacDonald's third child. Between 1868 and 1879, Mary Elizabeth gave birth to eleven children, nine of which survived into adulthood; six girls and three boys.

Margaret was born into a relatively wealthy catholic family. Both of her parents descended from the Scottish highlands and Margaret's great grandparents made their way from Scotland to Nova Scotia in the late 1700s. Margaret's parents had rather common jobs. Her mother, Mary Elizabeth Chisholm, was a housewife, like the vast majority of women of her time, and her father, Donald St. Daniel MacDonald, owned a general store in town. This store was the only source of farm products and imported goods from Montreal, The United States, and Great Britain, around the area. This store, paired with Donald St. Daniel MacDonald's aptitude with finances, was a great source of income for the MacDonald family and accounted for their rather wealthy status for that time period. This wealthier status provided Margaret and her siblings with many opportunities.

Margaret's Father died in 1906, when Margaret was 33 years old.

Education 
The relatively wealthy status of Margaret MacDonald's family provided her with many opportunities that were uncommon for girls of her time. For instance, Margaret had the opportunity to receive a good education from a young age, including reading, writing, arithmetic, geography and grammar, which was atypical for girls of that time. Margaret's mother placed great importance on education during her upbringing and played a big role in Margaret and the other MacDonald children's learning. This upbringing caused Margaret to greatly value education.

After her primary education at Stella Maris Convent School in Pictou, Margaret went on to follow her older sisters to Mount St. Vincent Academy in 1890, which was a convent school where she was taught by the Sisters of Charity. Here, Margaret developed a great empathy for others. During this time, she also gained an interest in nursing. In order to pursue this interest, Margaret continued her educational journey at Charity Hospital Training School in New York, where she was trained as a nurse. Margaret graduated from Charity Hospital Training School in 1895.

Career 
Margaret MacDonald's first job after completing her education was as a nurse in Panama. She did this for 18 months during the construction of the Panama Canal. She cared for those involved in the construction effort and the surrounding area. Panama was a location in which malaria was very prevalent and, in 1896, Margaret contracted the disease. She was promptly treated and recovered, but, after the fact, she decided to move on from Panama.

Margaret went on to become one of the first war nurses. Her first job affiliated with the military was aboard the military ship, Relief, during the Spanish–American War in 1898. Here, Margaret cared for American soldiers that were either sick or wounded in the war. Soon after, Margaret also served as a nurse during the South African War in 1900, where she was one of the first women to receive a military commission.

After her involvement with the South African war, Margaret returned to Canada, where she was soon named the Head Nurse of The Canadian Army Medical Corps. As the Head Nurse in the Corps, Margaret was in charge of the admission process and sought to keep a high reputation for the Corps and did not allow nurses to get involved unless they had proper, professional training, which was not very common in a time where most women did not receive a formal education. There were many volunteer nurses seeking involvement that were not formally trained, however, Margaret would not allow these nurses to join the nursing Corps in attempts of maintaining the integrity and reputation of the rapidly advancing military nursing profession. Margaret became known as a leader in the realm of military nursing. She was known for going against gender expectations of the time and working to make a place for women in the male-dominated military.

World War I marked a big change in Margaret's military career. She had moved to Britain to learn from their military nursing program, which was well known at the time. At this point in her life, Margaret became more focused on the leadership side of military nursing, rather than the actual nursing practice. During her time in Britain, she developed many leadership skills in order to successfully lead a group of women. She wanted to make a change for the women of her time and chip away at the harsh gender roles of the time. She made a huge step toward her goal in 1914, when she was named Matron in Chief of a group of military nurses that, during the war, would accumulate to over 3000 nurses. Margaret was the first woman to be given the title of Matron in Chief in the British Empire. During the War, Margaret was responsible for planning every move of her cadre of nurses. She had to ensure their safe and secure transportation, living conditions, health, etc. It was a difficult task, but Margaret's experience and leadership skills gave her great success and, despite several casualties due to the spread of illness, she led her group of nurses through each battle and, eventually, home after the War was over. This involvement World War I allowed these military nurses to rise in the military and in society. They saved the lives of many soldiers and one of the first times in this era, a group of women was seen as important.

Margaret returned to Canada in 1919. Here she aided in reorganizing The Royal Canadian Army Medical Corp, which was the new title of The Canadian Medical Corps, of which she was the head.

In 1920, when she was 51 years old, after many impactful years in the military nursing profession, Margaret retired. She then returned to her home town of Bailey's Brook, Nova Scotia where she died on September 7, 1948, at the age of 75.

Awards 
 Royal Red Cross (1916) 
 Florence Nightingale Medal (1918)
 Honorary DDL from Saint Francis Xavier University (1983)

References

1873 births
1948 deaths
Canadian military personnel of World War I
Female wartime nurses
Persons of National Historic Significance (Canada)
People from Pictou County
Canadian female military personnel
Canadian women in World War I
Members of the Royal Red Cross
Female nurses in World War I
Canadian military nurses
World War I nurses
Florence Nightingale Medal recipients
Canadian women nurses